Prajin Rungrote (1 January 1953) is a Thai former cyclist. He competed in the individual road race and team time trial events at the 1976 Summer Olympics.

References

External links
 

1953 births
Living people
Prajin Rungrote
Prajin Rungrote
Cyclists at the 1976 Summer Olympics
Place of birth missing (living people)
Prajin Rungrote